Ismael Urtubi Aróstegui (born 24 May 1961) is a Spanish retired footballer who played as a left midfielder.

An accomplished penalty kick taker, his entire professional career was spent with Athletic Bilbao with which he appeared in nearly 300 official matches, winning four major titles including two La Liga championships.

Club career
Born in Barakaldo, Biscay, Urtubi grew in Athletic Bilbao's youth system, Lezama. On 2 November 1980 he made his debut with the first team, playing two minutes in a 1–1 away draw against Sporting de Gijón in what would be his only La Liga appearance of the season.

In the summer of 1981, Urtubi moved to the Balearic Islands for his compulsory military service, spending a few months playing with RCD Mallorca in Segunda División and finishing the campaign with amateurs CD Margaritense, in both cases on loan. Upon his return he wasted no time making an impact in the Lions main squad, scoring 13 goals in 62 games combined as the Basque won back-to-back national championships and conquering the double in the latter season.

In the 1985 Copa del Rey final, against Atlético Madrid, referee Miguel Pérez awarded the Colchoneros a penalty kick after a controversial handball by Urtubi – Bibao eventually lost it 1–2. In the following league campaign the side finished in third position, with the player missing his first penalty ever, against Hércules CF, and manager Javier Clemente was also fired after five highly successful years.

Urtubi continued to be an undisputed starter with the following coaches, José Ángel Iribar and Howard Kendall, with Athletic finishing 13th and fourth, respectively, and reaching the semifinals of the domestic cup in 1987, bowing out to neighbouring Real Sociedad. On 15 February 1989, during a cup match against Real Valladolid, he suffered a severe injury in his left knee (posterior cruciate ligament, external and internal meniscus), but astonishingly recovered fully in a short period of time, although he later suffered a relapse.

In 1989–90, manager Txetxu Rojo, a former Athletic player and assistant coach during Kendall's spell, suggested Urtubi gained match fitness with the reserves. After the player refused he would make no more official appearances, but saw his importance in the squad increase after Clemente returned in June 1990, after elections at the club brought a new chairman.

On 16 March 1991, after a 0–2 loss at CD Castellón (in the previous matchday, Bilbao lost 0–6 at home against FC Barcelona), Clemente was fired, in what was Urtubi's last match in the Spanish top division. In 1991–92 his output consisted of one cup tie against Deportivo Alavés, scoring Athletic's goal through a penalty to help to a 1–1 draw in Álava and leaving the club after ten full seasons as a professional, amassing totals of 277 games and 37 goals.

Urtubi ended his career in 1995 at the age of 34, after playing amateur football with local sides SD Balmaseda FC and Zalla UC. Ten years later he had his first coaching experience, leading CD Mirandés to the second position in Tercera División.

International career
On 14 November 1984, Urtubi won the first of his two caps with Spain, starting in a 1–3 loss against Scotland for the 1986 FIFA World Cup qualifiers, in Glasgow. Two months later, he replaced Barcelona's Julio Alberto in the dying minutes of a 3–1 friendly win with Finland, in a match played in Valencia.

HonoursAthletic Bilbao'
La Liga: 1982–83, 1983–84
Copa del Rey: 1983–84
Supercopa de España: 1984

References

External links

1961 births
Living people
Spanish footballers
Footballers from Barakaldo
Association football midfielders
La Liga players
Segunda División players
Segunda División B players
Tercera División players
Bilbao Athletic footballers
Athletic Bilbao footballers
RCD Mallorca players
Zalla UC footballers
Spain international footballers
Basque Country international footballers
Spanish football managers
CD Mirandés managers